Musette may refer to:

Music
 Musette de cour, or baroque musette, a musical instrument of the bagpipe family
 Musette bechonnet, a type of French bagpipe
 Musette bressane, a type of French bagpipe 
 Oboe musette, or piccolo oboe, the smallest member of the oboe family
 Suona, a type of Chinese sorna (double-reeded horn)
 Bal-musette, a style of French instrumental music and dance that first became popular in the 1880s
 Musette tablature, a form of musical notation

Other uses
 Musette (cycling), a small bag given to riders in a feed zone during a cycle race
 Musette Brooks Gregory (1876–1921), African American suffragist and civil rights activist
 Musette Majendie (1903–1981), owner of Hedingham Castle
 , the name of several ships

See also